Schools in Sandefjord, Norway include:

Higher education

 Norwegian school of management (BI Vestfold)

Secondary/high schools

All external links are in Norwegian.
 Sandefjord videregående skole
 Skagerak International School
 Skiringssal folkehøyskole

Middle schools

All external links are in Norwegian.
 Skagerak Middle School,
 Breidablikk
 Ranvik
 Varden
 Bugården

Primary schools
All external links are in Norwegian.
 Skagerak Primary School, IB World School delivering Primary Years Programme (PYP)
 Haukerød, north of the city
 Krokemoa, approximately 4 km west of the city
 Byskolen, the oldest school in Sandefjord
 Unneberg, the smallest in the municipality
 Gokstad, by the north end of Østerøya
 Virik
 Sande, close to the city
 Framnes
 Fevang
 Helgerød
 Mosserød
 Store Bergan
 Ormestad

See also 
 List of schools in Norway

Education in Vestfold og Telemark
Sandefjord
Sandefjord